The 1979 California Golden Bears football team represented the University of California, Berkeley during the 1979 NCAA Division I-A football season.

Cal claims a loss to Oregon as a victory, as "Oregon forfeited due to ineligible player."

Schedule

 Note: Oregon forfeited victory due to use of ineligible player.

Personnel

Game summaries

at Washington State

at Stanford

Cal stopped Stanford on the two-yard line with 40 seconds left to claim victory.

References

External links
Game program: California at Washington State – November 10, 1979

California
California Golden Bears football seasons
California Golden Bears football